Parapolytretus rugosus is a species of beetle in the family Cerambycidae, and the only species in the genus Parapolytretus. It was described by Matsushita in 1933.

References

Lamiini
Beetles described in 1933